In 2018, Iran recognized cryptocurrency mining as a legal industry in order to monitor and regulate the mining farms that were already operating. In July 2018, President Hassan Rouhani's administration declared its intention of launching a national cryptocurrency, a news agency affiliated with the Central Bank of Iran outlined multiple features of the national cryptocurrency, stating that it would be backed by the Iran's national currency, the rial. The cryptocurrency could allow Iranians to make international transactions amidst trade embargo. As of December 2020 Iranians traded between $16 to $20 million in 12 different cryptocurrencies each day.
Iran's mining amount of bitcoin is close to $1 billion a year.

Rial Currency 
Rial Currency will be the digital currency of the Central Bank of Iran, which is considered as electronic cash and will be the electronic version of common banknotes in Iran. Its value is also attached to the existing traditional paper rial. According to the emphasis of the Central Bank of Iran, Rial Currency, unlike cryptocurrencies such as Bitcoin, cannot be mined and its supply will be regulated by this bank.

See also
Digital currency

References 

Cryptocurrencies
Economy of Iran